See Stasys Lozoraitis Jr. for an article about a son of Stasys Lozoraitis.

Stasys Lozoraitis (born: September 5, 1898 - December 24, 1983) was a prominent Lithuanian diplomat and politician who served as the Foreign Minister of Lithuania from 1934 until 1938. After Lithuania lost its independence in June 1940, Lozoraitis headed the Lithuanian diplomatic service from 1940 to his death in 1983. Most western countries did not recognize the Soviet occupation and continued to recognize legations and envoys of independent Lithuania thus maintaining the legal continuity of Lithuania.

Lozoraitis was a son of Motiejus Lozoraitis, a lawyer, activist of the Lithuanian National Revival, and contributor to Varpas. In 1923 he was assigned to the Lithuanian legation in Berlin. While in Germany, Lozoraitis studied international law at the University of Berlin. In 1929, he was transferred to Rome, where he became chargé d'affaires in 1931. In 1932, he returned to Lithuania and worked at the Ministry of Foreign Affairs, becoming the Minister in June 1934. He worked to establish the Baltic Entente and to normalize relations with Poland, with which there were no diplomatic relations since Żeligowski's Mutiny in 1920. Lozoraitis resigned after Poland presented an ultimatum in 1938 to resume diplomatic relations.

In February 1939, Lozoraitis was appointed as minister plenipotentiary to Italy. After the Lithuania was occupied by the Soviet Union in June 1940, Lozoraitis became the leader of all Lithuanian diplomatic service that remained abroad. As the highest de jure official of independent Lithuania, he represented Lithuania, advocated for non-recognition of the Soviet occupation, and popularized the Lithuanian cause. Lozoraitis continued to live in Rome and head the diplomatic service until his death on December 24, 1983. Upon his death, he was succeeded by Stasys Bačkis.

References

External links
  Collection of documents related to Lozoraitis' diplomatic service

1898 births
1983 deaths
Lithuanian diplomats
Ministers of Foreign Affairs of Lithuania
World War II political leaders
Baltic diplomatic missions
Burials at Petrašiūnai Cemetery